High School Bowl is a quiz bowl television program produced by WNMU. Each season of High School Bowl  features 40 high schools from the Upper Peninsula of Michigan and northern Wisconsin who compete against each other in a bracketed tournament, vying to become the annual champion. Each team is composed of four people, including a captain, who answer questions on a myriad of subjects: including history, science, art, math, music, literature, and geography. Questions for High School Bowl have been provided by National Academic Quiz Tournaments since 2014. High School Bowl has been hosted by Jim Koski since 2014; past hosts include G.G. Gordon and Dave Goldsmith. As of 2019, High School Bowl is WNMU Public TV-13's highest rated production.

At the end of every season, Northern Michigan University, where WNMU programs are filmed, awards scholarships to the first and second place teams, $2500 and $1500 respectively. Moreover, at the conclusion of every season, one college-bound senior contestant receives the Dave Goldsmith Scholarship, $1500 that can go towards a college education. The scholarship was set up by the Goldsmith family in 2002 after his death, and previously Dave Goldsmith hosted High School Bowl for 24 years.

Records
Since High School Bowls inception in 1977, Houghton High School of Houghton, Michigan has taken the most championships out of every other participating high school; an incredible 10 wins out of 41 seasons. Second to Houghton in terms of wins is Marquette Senior High School of Marquette, Michigan with 7 secured championships. Other notable participants include Gladstone High School of Gladstone, Michigan and Hancock Central High School of Hancock, Michigan, both with 4 victories.

In recorded history, Marquette Senior High School has the most second-place finishes, with 6. Second to Marquette Senior High School are Sault Area High School of Sault Ste. Marie, Michigan and Luther L. Wright High School of Ironwood, Michigan, who have both achieved 5 runner-up finishes. Marquette Senior High School holds the record for the greatest consecutive streak of victories, having won five years in a row from 1979 to 1983, Negaunee High School follows closely with three consecutive wins from 2010 to 2012.

Past winners

Source:

References

External links
 

Student quiz television series